Progress 41 was a Soviet unmanned Progress cargo spacecraft, which was launched in March 1989 to resupply the Mir EO-4 expedition aboard the Mir space station.

Launch
Progress 41 launched on 16 March 1999 from the Baikonur Cosmodrome in the Kazakh SSR. It used a Soyuz-U2 rocket.

Docking
Progress 41 docked with the aft port of the Kvant-1 module of Mir on 18 March 1989 at 20:50:46 UTC, and was undocked on 21 April 1989 at 01:46:15 UTC.

Decay
It remained in orbit until 25 April 1989. Progress 41 deorbited in an uncontrolled decay, after it had run out of fuel from boosting Mir into a higher orbit. The mission ended at 12:02 UTC.

See also

 1989 in spaceflight
 List of Progress missions
 List of uncrewed spaceflights to Mir

References

Progress (spacecraft) missions
1989 in the Soviet Union
Spacecraft launched in 1989
Spacecraft which reentered in 1989
Spacecraft launched by Soyuz-U rockets